Porichthys myriaster, commonly known as specklefin midshipman, is a species of  toad fish in the family Batrachoididae.

Description 
Porichthys myriaster can grow to 51cm in length.

Distribution and habitat 
Porichthys myriaster is found from the intertidal zone to 126 m depth in the eastern Pacific, from California, USA to northern Peru. It inhabits both rocky areas and soft bottoms and is common in bays.

Ecology and behaviour 
Porichthys myriaster will often rest on or bury itself in the soft bottom sediments. It can create a humming or grunting sound and is more active during the nighttime.

References 

Batrachoididae
Fish described in 1939